The Harry S. Truman Office and Courtroom was the office used by Harry S. Truman during his early political years.  It is located in the Jackson County Courthouse in Independence, Missouri.

History
The Office used by Truman is available for tours by the Jackson County Historical Society.  Guided tours include a 30-minute video, The Man From Independence, about the life of Harry Truman in Independence, Missouri.

Sources

External links
 Truman Courthouse - Jackson County Historical Society, information on tours

Harry S. Truman
Museums in Jackson County, Missouri
Independence, Missouri
Presidential museums in Missouri